András Horváth may refer to:

 András Horváth (footballer, born 1980), Hungarian footballer
 András Horváth (footballer, born 1988), Hungarian footballer
 András Horváth (ice hockey) (born 1976), Hungarian ice hockey player
 András Tibor Horváth (born 1964), Hungarian politician